Mary Hoade is a Fianna Fáil Councillor for the Tuam Local Electoral Area on Galway County Council.

A native of Headford she was first elected in the 1999 Irish local elections and was re-elected again in the following elections in 2004.  Following boundary changes she moved electoral areas to Tuam and was successfully returned again in the 2009 Irish local elections. In 2014 she polled 1,886 first preferences and was elected to the fourth seat exceeding the quota.

After these elections she was elections she was elected Mayor of Galway as part of a Fianna Fáil-Fine Gael pact.

On 28 May 2015, she was selected as one of three candidates to contest the Galway West constituency along with Éamon Ó Cuív and former Galway City Councillor, John Connolly.

References

External links
Electoral History
Hoade second female Cathaoirleach of Galway in 100 years
Fianna Fáil select three candidates for Galway West

Politicians from County Galway
Living people
Fianna Fáil politicians
Local councillors in County Galway
Year of birth missing (living people)